Omaruru may refer to:

 Omaruru, Namibia
 Omaruru Constituency, Namibia
 Omaruru River, Namibia